This is a list of the French SNEP Top 100 Singles and Top 200 Albums number ones of 2013.

Number ones by week

Singles chart

Albums chart

See also
2013 in music
List of number-one hits (France)
List of top 10 singles in 2013 (France)

References

Number-one hits
France
2013